Nigaho Island is an island in Papua New Guinea, part of the Calvados Chain within the Louisiade Archipelago. 
Politically, it is in Pana Tinani Ward, not like the other Calvados Chain islands which all belong to the Calvados Chain Ward. 
It is the most densely populated island of the chain.
It is the most eastern island of the chain.

References

Islands of Milne Bay Province
Louisiade Archipelago